Burnham Abbey was a house of Augustinian canonesses regular near Burnham in Buckinghamshire, England. It was founded in 1266 by Richard, 1st Earl of Cornwall. The abbey of St Mary consisted of around twenty nuns at the outset, but was never wealthy and by the time of its dissolution in 1539 there were only ten.

Since 1916 the surviving buildings have been the home of an Anglican contemplative community, the Society of the Precious Blood who retain the name "Burnham Abbey".

History

The abbey was founded in 1265/6 by Richard, Earl of Cornwall, styled King of the Romans, the brother of King Henry III. Richard endowed it with several manors, including the manor of Burnham, and 'land appurtenant to the manor of Cippenham with a mill, fishery and other rights'. The abbey was situated about a half mile from Burnham. A complaint was made shortly after the foundation that Richard had diverted a watercourse to the abbey that had been used by a nearby village and that he also had given  of common land to the monastery. It is unknown whether this issue was resolved.

In 1311 a nun, Margery of Hedsor, left the monastery and her vows and was subsequently excommunicated. This sentence was renewed periodically for some years until it was cancelled by the Bishop for reasons unknown.

A serious legal dispute occurred in 1330, concerning the ownership of the manor of Bulstrode, which had been granted to the abbey but was claimed by a Geoffrey de Bulstrode, who in protest proceeded to vandalise the property and harass the servants of the abbess. Eventually a commission found in favour of the abbey, but by then there had been substantial losses.

Seizure
Having few assets, Burnham Abbey should have been closed in the first wave of the Dissolution of the Monasteries in 1536, but a petition by local commissioners delayed its end until 1539. The document of surrender, dated 19 September 1539, was signed by Alice Baldwin, as Abbess, and the nine remaining nuns. There were also two priests.   At the dissolution, the Abbey's revenues were estimated at £51 2s 4-1/2d. The Abbess was granted a small pension and appears to have spent her remaining years at Aylesbury at the home of her father, Sir John Baldwin, Lord Chief Justice of the Common Pleas.

Later ownership
In 1544 a grant of the site of the abbey was made to William Tyldesley, a Groom of the Chamber, and in 1574 Queen Elizabeth granted a lease of the property to Paul Wentworth, who had married Tyldesley's widow, Helen. In 1569, Thomas Howard, 4th Duke of Norfolk, was detained there before being sent to the Tower of London. The church was demolished in about 1570 and a house was formed from much of the remaining buildings. By 1719, it was a farm with some of the buildings such as the refectory in  poor condition.

In 1913 James Lawrence Bissley, an architect and surveyor, purchased the property and restored the remaining buildings, converting the original chapter house into a chapel. In 1916 he sold the property to the Society of the Precious Blood, a community of Anglican Augustinian nuns, who took possession and began to restore and extend the abbey for their use.

The Abbey is a Grade I listed building, while the associated walls and structures are Grade II. The chapter house, sacristy, and parts of the frater and infirmary remain of the medieval nunnery.

Gallery

See also
List of monastic houses in Buckinghamshire
List of monastic houses in England

References

 'House of Austin nuns: The abbey of Burnham', A History of the County of Buckingham: Volume 1 (1905), pp. 382–84.
 Anthony New; A Guide to the Abbeys of England And Wales, pp. 88–90. Constable.

External links

Website of the modern convent at Burnham Abbey

Grade I listed buildings in Buckinghamshire
Grade I listed monasteries
History of Buckinghamshire
Monasteries in Buckinghamshire
Augustinian nunneries in England
1266 establishments in England
1539 disestablishments in England
Religious organizations established in the 1260s
Christian monasteries established in the 13th century
Monasteries dissolved under the English Reformation
Burnham, Buckinghamshire